Chelsea is a community in the Canadian province of Nova Scotia, located in the Lunenburg Municipal District in Lunenburg County, Nova Scotia. It was probably named for Chelsea, London.

External links
Chelsea on Destination Nova Scotia

References

Communities in the Region of Queens Municipality
General Service Areas in Nova Scotia